The Fresno Flume and Irrigation Company was established in 1891 as a logging and water transportation company in California. A 45-mile cedar flume was built to transport lumber from Shaver Lake to the finishing mill in Clovis. The company changed its name to the Fresno Flume and Lumber Company in 1908, and over the course of its 21-year lifespan, cut an average of 25 million board feet of lumber each year. However, in 1912, the company was sold and ceased all operations after a storm destroyed  of the flume. In 1919, Southern California Edison Company bought most of the Shaver property for the Big Creek Hydroelectric Project.

History  
The Fresno Flume and Irrigation Company was established in 1891 by a group of local business owners and Michigan lumbermen, C.B. Shaver and Lewis Swift. The company built a dam across Stevenson Creek to form Shaver Lake, which served as both a storage pond for logs and the source of water for the flume.

It was assembled in units called boxes, with 320 boxes equaling . The total project cost was $270,000. Logging started in 1894 using ox-drawn wagons and steam engines, with an estimated  of rough lumber arriving in Clovis daily at peak production.

Initially, the flume was intended to transport both lumber and water, but legal disputes over the use of water from the San Joaquin River led to a temporary injunction that only allowed the company to float lumber in the v-flume.

A standard gauge logging railroad known as the Shaver Lake Railroad was built in 1901 to haul timber from the woods.
 

Legacy 
In 1908, the company changed its name to the Fresno Flume and Lumber Company to reflect its focus on lumber production. However, in 1912, the remaining stockholders sold the company to Ira Bennett, who soon found himself in financial trouble after a storm destroyed  of the flume. Bennett ceased all logging operations soon after. The success of the Fresno Flume and Irrigation Company, along with the neighboring Madera Sugar Pine Company, demonstrated the effectiveness of v-flumes for lumber transportation. 
In 1919, Southern California Edison Company purchased most of the Shaver property for its Big Creek hydroelectric project and, in 1927, built a new dam that greatly expanded Shaver Lake.

References 

Logging in the United States
History of the Sierra Nevada (United States)
Narrow gauge railroads in California
Sierra National Forest
Sierra Nevada (United States)
Defunct California railroads
Railway companies established in 1891
American companies established in 1891
Closed railway lines in the United States